Margaret Ramsbotham is a former Papua New Guinea international lawn bowler.

Bowls career
In 1973 she won the triples bronze medal with Con Newbury and Olive Howard at the 1973 World Outdoor Bowls Championship. 

She also won two Port Moresby Singles Championships.

References

Living people
Papua New Guinean female bowls players
Year of birth missing (living people)